Scott Melbourne Ferson is a public relations executive and a Democratic Party strategist from Massachusetts. He has served as press secretary for Senator Edward M. Kennedy, communications director for Congressman Stephen Lynch, and senior advisor during Congressman Seth Moulton's 2014 campaign. His firm, the Liberty Square Group, is a strategic communications firm representing corporate, nonprofit, and through its political division, the Blue Lab, political clients.

Education
Ferson was born in Medford, Massachusetts and raised in Burlington. He attended Southeastern Massachusetts University (now the University of Massachusetts Dartmouth) where he earned a bachelor's degree in Political Science. While he was a student, Ferson was introduced to political organizing on the John B. Anderson presidential campaign in 1980 as the Burlington, Massachusetts coordinator. After graduating, he worked for the newly elected Congressman Chester G. Atkins of the 5th district in Massachusetts, focusing on economic development issues in Lawrence and Lowell.

Ferson later earned a master's degree in Strategic Public Relations from George Washington University.

Early career
In 1987 he left Atkins' office for Congressman Richard Gephardt's campaign for president. He then joined Senator Edward M. Kennedy's staff, working in his Boston office as his press secretary and his Massachusetts issues director from 1990 to 1995, including Kennedy's 1994 re-election campaign against Mitt Romney.

Ferson next began a career in the private sector, handling a broad range of issues including the successful effort of the Church of Jesus Christ of Latter-day Saints to build a temple in Belmont and the launch of the Fishing Health Care Partnership.

The Liberty Square Group
In 1999, as national firms acquired smaller companies, Ferson started his own business, the Liberty Square Group. As president, Ferson represents New England nonprofit and corporate interests and directs regional political campaigns. Today, the Liberty Square Group is a full service public affairs firm with a dozen associates, handling government affairs, public relations, press issues, and government marketing on local, state, and federal levels.

Ferson has managed press for the LDS Church, for Stephen Lynch's election to the US Congress, and for Tim Murray's run for Lieutenant Governor of Massachusetts. He has offered communications counsel to groups including the Mashpee Wompanoag Tribe and the Special Olympics International Games.

In 2011, Ferson and Sean Sinclair, a former campaign manager for Senator Harry Reid, founded The Blue Lab, an incubator for Democratic campaigns and a comprehensive campaign resource for candidates. Based on the startup model, the consultants and interns seek to cut costs for clients through shared space and lateral input.

In 2014, he was senior adviser and general consultant for Seth Moulton in his upset win for Massachusetts's 6th congressional district, cited by Roll Call as one of the 10 best run congressional campaigns of 2014.

In 2018, Ferson was contracted by Columbia Gas to manage the media in the aftermath of the Merrimack Valley gas explosions. 

In 2020, Ferson was a key strategy and communications advisor to Senator Ed Markey during the Senator's historic primary victory against Congressman Joe Kennedy III.

Teaching
In 2013, Ferson started working as an adjunct professor at Stonehill College.

Personal life
Scott Ferson is a resident of Belmont where he formerly served as the president of The First Church in Belmont Unitarian Universalist and as president of the Belmont Library Foundation. He currently sits on the board of Sail Boston.

References

External links
 Liberty Square Group
 The Blue Lab
 Scott Ferson’s Blog

Living people
Massachusetts Democrats
American political consultants
University of Massachusetts Dartmouth alumni
People from Medford, Massachusetts
People from Burlington, Massachusetts
1961 births